Gonghe County, also known as Kungho, is a county of Qinghai Province, China under the administration of Hainan Prefecture. The seat of Gonghe County is in the town of Qabqa.

Demographics 
In 2006, 55% of the population were Tibetans, with Han, Hui, Mongolian and Salar minorities.

Economy 
Gonghe is rich in grassland, used for animal husbandry. Crops such as wheat, barley, peas, potatoes, beans, oilseed and oats are also grown.

Geography
The county is located along Qinghai Lake. Local grasslands have been at risk of desertification, combated by newly planted grassland and forests.

Climate

See also

 List of administrative divisions of Qinghai
 1990 Gonghe earthquake
Longyangxia Dam

References

County-level divisions of Qinghai
Hainan Tibetan Autonomous Prefecture